Health Poverty Action is a British non-governmental organisation, founded in 1984 as "Health Unlimited", that aims to secure health care access for marginalised communities in developing countries. It is working with communities and health service providers, they undertake long-term projects targeted at women and children in remote, often war-torn, areas. They prioritize projects focusing on indigenous communities and communities affected by conflict and political instability.

The organisation aims to bring sustainable solutions to people suffering from poor health due to war, poverty, or marginalization from care for other reasons.

History 

Health Poverty Action was founded in 1984. Its first programme was in southern Afghanistan, where the founders of the organisation recognised the strong link between war and health. They provided care and assistance to communities in Afghanistan during the 1980s and early 1990s. They have also aided communities in The Karen, Kachin and Wa, in the hills of Burma for more than 15 years.

At that time Health Unlimited offered short courses to orientate health care professionals in the UK to development needs, for example in May 1993 there was a course called Learning to Teach which provided guidance for those travelling to low income settings offer health promotion interventions.

In March 2010, Health Unlimited changed its name to better reflect its work and so that its purpose would be more recognisable.

Approach 

Health Poverty Action aims its work at those communities others have forgotten. They aim to improve health services and immunisation programmes but also look at the bigger picture and target other areas such as nutrition, access to water, sanitation and income generation. The idea is to give these people the boost they need to be self-sustaining, rather than handing out short-term health solutions.

Alerting local authorities to the need for better health service is a big part of the work of Health Poverty Action. Equipping the affected communities to voice their concerns to their local authorities is an important part of this; however, they also campaign to the governments of leading nations to lead the way in providing better health services to victimised and marginalised people. In theory, this will help everyone, not just those people that Health Poverty Action already runs programmes for.

Health Poverty Action subscribes to the People In Aid Code of Good Practice, an internationally recognised management tool that helps agencies enhance the quality of their human resources management.

Current 

Health Poverty Action is now supporting programmes in 12 countries across Africa, Asia and Latin America. They have established relationships with many indigenous peoples and ethnic minorities such as:

The San in Namibia
The Maya K'iche' in Guatemala in the aftermath of the civil war
The Quechua in Peru
The Bunong, Jarai, Kreung and Tampoeun in Cambodia
The Taleang, Tampoeun and Oye in southern Laos

See also
ARCHIVE Institute

References

External links
Official website

Health charities in the United Kingdom